Santa Barbara Beach may refer to:
East Beach (Santa Barbara), a beach in the city of Santa Barbara, California
West Beach (Santa Barbara), a beach in the city of Santa Barbara, California
Santa Barbara Beach, Curaçao, a beach on the Caribbean island of Curaçao
Playa de Santa Bárbara, a beach  in Andalusia, Spain